Enoch Teye Mensah (born 17 May 1946) is a Ghanaian politician. He was a Minister for Education and a Member of Parliament in Ghana from January 1997 till January 2017. He is popularly referred to as E. T. Mensah.

Education and early life
Mensah was born on 17 May 1946 and comes from Prampram in the Greater Accra Region Ghana. He schooled at the SNAPS College of Accountancy, which he completed in 1968. He also had his RSA III in 1970, and he became a fellow of the Institute of Financial Accountants in 1986. He is an Account Officer and worked at the University of Ghana, Legon as Accounting Officer.

Political career

As Mayor of Accra 
During the time of the PNDC military regime in Ghana, he was the long time Chief Executive of the Accra Metropolitan Assembly (AMA), akin to being the Mayor of the City of Accra. He joined the National Democratic Congress when it was formed in 1992.

As Member of Parliament 
He also stood for the Ghanaian parliamentary election in 1996 and was elected MP for the Ningo-Prampram constituency, holding the seat for almost a decade. After the NDC lost the 2000 elections, he continued as a member of parliament. Mensah lost the  NDC primaries  to Sam George on 21 November 2015. He once served as the Minority Chief Whip in parliament prior to the Ghanaian parliamentary election in 2008. In January 2009, he became the MMjority Chief Whip in parliament.

As Minister of State 
At the beginning of the Fourth Republic, he was appointed Minister for Youth and Sports by President Jerry Rawlings. Mensah held that position through both terms of the Rawlings government.
In January 2010, after a cabinet reshuffle, President John Atta Mills appointed him Minister for Employment and Social Welfare.

Mensah was a member of the Pan-African Parliament until January 2009, when he resigned after being appointed a member of state. In January 2011, he was appointed Minister for Education following the resignation of Betty Mould-Iddrisu.

On 12 February 2021, Mensah was unanimously elected as the representative of Council of State for the Greater Accra Region.

Personal life
Mr. Mensah is married with seven children.

Elections 
Mensah, is a Ghanaian politician and was elected as a member of Parliament of the second parliament of the fourth republic of Ghana during the 1996 Ghanaian General Election.  He polled a total valid vote cast of 15,677 representing 56.10%  defeating his opponents; Desmond Nene Quaynor who polled 1,569 which represent 5.60% of the total votes cast  and Gwendolyn Sara Addo an Independent candidate who also polled 1,537 representing 5.50% under the membership of the National Democratic Congress. He maintained his seat as a member of Parliament for the Ningo Prampram constituency through to 2016 were he lost to Samuel George Nartey.

Honours 
E. T. Mensah was awarded the Companion of the Order of the Volta by President Kufuor's government.

See also
Rawlings government
List of Mills government ministers

References

External links and sources
Profile on Parliament of Ghana website

Living people
Ghanaian MPs 1997–2001
Ghanaian MPs 2001–2005
Ghanaian MPs 2005–2009
Ghanaian MPs 2009–2013
Ghanaian MPs 2013–2017
Government ministers of Ghana
Sports ministers of Ghana
Members of the Pan-African Parliament from Ghana
National Democratic Congress (Ghana) politicians
1946 births
Recipients of the Order of the Volta
Mayors of Accra
People from Greater Accra Region